Super-Electric is the second EP by English-French rock band Stereolab, released in September 1991 by Too Pure. All four tracks were later included on Switched On.

Track listing
 "Super-Electric" – 5:22
 "High Expectation" – 3:32
 "The Way Will Be Opening" – 4:07
 "Contact" – 8:17

Cover versions
 The Flowers of Hell released a string & brass reworking of the song "Super-Electric" on their 2012 covers album Odes.

References

External links

1991 EPs
Stereolab EPs